Djibouti is a 2010 crime fiction work by American writer Elmore Leonard.

Plot
In the novel, Dara Barr is an "Oscar-winning documentary film maker" and her "6 feet 6, age 72, African American, über-cool" confidant and assistant Xavier LeBo arrive in Djibouti to document piracy around the Horn of Africa.

Critical reception
Writing in The Guardian, Giles Foden described the subject matter of the book as "well researched and not as improbable as it might seem."

Writing in The Independent, Barry Forshaw noted that the fictional young film maker and her older adviser might resemble the production Katherine Bigelow's 2008 film The Hurt Locker.

References

2010 American novels
Novels by Elmore Leonard
Novels set in Africa
William Morrow and Company books
Djibouti in fiction